Estelle Page, née Lawson (March 22, 1907 - May 7, 1983) was an American amateur golfer. A native of Chapel Hill, North Carolina, her father was Bob Lawson, the first athletic director at the University of North Carolina at Chapel Hill.  She graduated from Chapel Hill High School (Chapel Hill, North Carolina) where she played tennis and basketball.

In 1935, Lawson won her first of seven North and South Women's Amateurs at the Pinehurst Resort, a record that still stands. In 1936 she married Julius A. Page Jr. and made their home in Chapel Hill. At that year's U.S. Women's Amateur, Page won the medal for the lowest round during the qualifying matches and won the medal again in 1937 and went on to defeat Patty Berg in the finals to win the most important amateur championship in the U.S. In 1938, at Westmoreland Country Club, the two met again in the finals, this time the victory went to Berg.

Page was part of the U.S. team that won the 1938 Curtis Cup and ten years later she was part of another Curtis Cup winning team. She won three straight North Carolina Women's Amateur Match Play Championships (1950–52), nine Women's Carolinas Amateur between 1932 and 1949. and retired with 22 tournament victories to her credit. Following the creation of the North Carolina Sports Hall of Fame in 1963, she was part of the first group to be inducted.

Page died in 1983 and was interred in the Old Chapel Hill Cemetery in Chapel Hill.

Tournament wins
this list is incomplete
1932 Women's Carolinas Amateur
1933 Women's Carolinas Amateur
1935 North and South Women's Amateur
1936 Women's Carolinas Amateur
1937 North and South Women's Amateur, U.S. Amateur
1938 Women's Carolinas Amateur
1939 North and South Women's Amateur
1940 North and South Women's Amateur, Women's Carolinas Amateur
1941 North and South Women's Amateur, Women's Carolinas Amateur
1944 North and South Women's Amateur
1945 North and South Women's Amateur
1946 Women's Carolinas Amateur
1947 Women's Carolinas Amateur
1949 Women's Carolinas Amateur
1950 North Carolina Women's Amateur Match Play Championship
1951 North Carolina Women's Amateur Match Play Championship
1952 North Carolina Women's Amateur Match Play Championship

Team appearances
Amateur
Curtis Cup (representing the United States): 1938 (winners), 1948 (winners)

References

External links

Golf in North Carolina

American female golfers
Amateur golfers
Winners of ladies' major amateur golf championships
Golfers from North Carolina
Chapel Hill High School (Chapel Hill, North Carolina) alumni
People from Chapel Hill, North Carolina
1907 births
1983 deaths
20th-century American women
20th-century American people